This article contains a list of primary and secondary legislation enacted by the Parliament of the United Kingdom in connection with the COVID-19 pandemic.

Primary legislation

Secondary legislation in England

Notes

References

External links
Coronavirus Statutory Instruments Dashboard – Hansard Society
Lockdown laws in England: One year on – House of Commons Library, 23 March 2021

COVID-19 pandemic
2020 in England
COVID-19 pandemic in England
Public health in the United Kingdom
COVID-19 pandemic legislation

United Kingdom responses to the COVID-19 pandemic